Reign of Terror (reissued as The Black Book) is a 1949 American spy thriller film directed by Anthony Mann and starring Robert Cummings, Richard Basehart and Arlene Dahl. The film is set during the French Revolution. Plotters seek to bring down Maximilien Robespierre and end his bloodthirsty Reign of Terror.

Plot
The most powerful man in France, Maximilien Robespierre, wants to become the nation's Dictator. He summons François Barras, the only man who can nominate him before the National Convention. Barras refuses to do so and goes into hiding.

Meanwhile, patriot Charles D'Aubigny secretly kills and impersonates Duval, the prosecutor of Strasbourg, who Robespierre summoned to Paris for unknown purposes (which Robespierre's enemies wish to ascertain). Neither Robespierre nor Fouché, the chief of his secret police, have met Duval before, so the substitution goes undetected. Robespierre informs D'Aubigny that his black book, containing the names of those he intends to denounce and have executed, has been stolen. Robespierre's numerous foes are kept in check by not knowing whether their names are on the list or not. If they were to learn for certain that they are on the list, they would band together against him. He gives D'Aubigny authority over everyone in France and 24 hours to retrieve the book.

D'Aubigny meets Barras through his sole contact, Madelon, whom D'Aubigny once loved. However, he was followed, and the police, led by Saint-Just, arrests Barras. Despite being in an uncomfortable position, D'Aubigny manages to allay both sides' suspicions that he has betrayed them.

Visiting Barras in prison, he informs him that three of his men have been murdered. Strangely, their rooms have not been ransacked in search of the book, leading D'Aubigny to surmise that it was never stolen in the first place, and that Robespierre is using the alleged theft to distract his foes. Saint-Just, still suspicious, sends for Duval's wife to identify her husband. Pretending to be Madame Duval, Madelon extricates D'Aubigny while the real Madame Duval awaits at the gate.

Before news of his impersonation spreads, D'Aubigny returns to Robespierre's private office—located in the back rooms of a bakery—to look for the book. There, he encounters Fouché. When D'Aubigny finds the book, Fouché tries to stab him. D'Aubigny strangles him into unconsciousness and escapes. He and Madelon hide out at the farmhouse of fellow conspirators, the Blanchards, who are either under arrest in Paris or already dead at the hands of St. Just's Sergeant. St. Just goes to the Blanchards' farm and gets no help from anyone there. D'Aubigny and Madelon flee on horseback, and a chase ensues. D'Aubigny gets away, but Madelon is caught and taken back to Paris. Despite being tortured by the Sergeant, she refuses to talk.

The Convention is assembled and about to convene. Fouché shows up and shows an earring of Madelon's to D'Aubigny. Without the book, many more will die, Dissolve to the Convention. Fouché tips his hat to Robespierre, but Barras sees book being passed from hand to hand among the delegates while Robespierre denounces Barras in a speech. Meanwhile, D'Aubigny searches Robespierre's office and the Sergeant takes her to a hidden room. Robespierre concludes his speech and is shocked to find himself denounced and pursued by the mob. He is followed to his office and nearly brings them to heel with his golden words. However, Fouché orders a man to shoot Robespierre through the jaw, silencing him forever. This makes it impossible for a desperate D'Aubigny to learn where Madelon is. Robespierre is taken to the Guillotine.

D'Aubigny returns to Robespierre's office and tears it apart. In despair, he tosses his torch to the floor in front of a bookcase, planning to burn everything. The torch reveals a stain on the floor that leads him to the secret room. He kills the Sergeant and rescues Madelon.

Outside the bakery, Fouché starts talking with an army officer as the crowd celebrates the death of Robespierre. Fouché, about to take leave of the officer, asks his name. The man replies, "Bonaparte. Napoleon Bonaparte." Fouché, unimpressed, still promises to remember the name.

Cast
The cast list includes:

 Robert Cummings as Charles D'Aubigny
 Richard Basehart as Maximilien Robespierre
 Richard Hart as François Barras
 Arlene Dahl as Madelon
 Arnold Moss as Fouché
 Norman Lloyd as Tallien
 Charles McGraw as Sergeant
 Beulah Bondi as Grandma Blanchard
 Jess Barker as Louis Antoine de Saint-Just
 Wade Crosby as Danton
 Russ Tamblyn as Pierre's oldest son

Production
In August 1948, Wanger signed a deal with Cummings to star in the film. In order to get him, the movie became a co-production with Cummings' own company, United Californian.  Arlene Dahl was borrowed from MGM.

Producer Walter Wanger, director Anthony Mann, cinematographer John Alton, and production designer William Cameron Menzies used their combined talents to make a low budget "epic" using Broadway stars and shooting on sets only costing $40,000.

It was the first collaboration between Mann and Philip Yordan. Yordan says the original script by Aeneas MacKenzie which was"nothing but speeches, Robespierre and all this." Yordan says he told Mann "you can't follow the script unless you're a student of the French Revolution" so he suggested the story be simplified to be about Cummings tracking down a book containing the names of anti-Revolutionaries before Robespierre could get it.

Filming started August 23, 1948 and ended in early October 1948 . The film premiered in New Orleans, Louisiana, on June 16, 1949.

The film's original working title was The Black Book. It was released as Reign of Terror, but when it played New York later that year it was renamed The Black Book .

See also
 Public domain film
 List of American films of 1949
 List of films in the public domain in the United States

References

External links
 
 
 
 
 

1949 films
1940s historical drama films
American historical drama films
Films about Maximilien Robespierre
American black-and-white films
Eagle-Lion Films films
Films directed by Anthony Mann
Films produced by Walter Wanger
Depictions of Napoleon on film
Cultural depictions of Maximilien Robespierre
Films scored by Sol Kaplan
1940s English-language films
1940s American films